Melanella cunaeformis is a species of sea snail, a marine gastropod mollusk in the family Eulimidae.

Distribution
This marine species is endemic to Australia and occurs off South Australia and Tasmania

References

 May, W. L. (1915 [1916]). Additions to the Tasmanian marine Mollusca, with descriptions of new species. Papers and Proceedings of the Royal Society of Tasmania. (1915): 75-99
 Cotton, B.C. 1959. South Australian Mollusca. Archaeogastropoda. Handbook of the Flora and Fauna of South Australia. Adelaide : South Australian Government Printer 449 pp.

External links
 To World Register of Marine Species

cunaeformis
Gastropods of Australia
Gastropods described in 1915